David Florence (born 8 August 1982) is a retired British  slalom canoeist who competed at the international level from 1999 to 2021. He is the 2013 and 2015 world champion in individual single canoe (C1) and 2013 champion in double canoe (C2), the latter with Richard Hounslow. Florence was the first canoeist since Charles Dussuet, sixty years earlier, to achieve the C1, C2 double at the same World Championships.

Florence won silver medals at three consecutive Olympics: in the C1 in 2008 and in the C2 in 2012 and 2016 (with Richard Hounslow).

He announced his retirement from the sport in May 2022.

Early life
Having been born in Aberdeen, Florence lived in Edinburgh between the ages of 7 and 18 on the same street as future world and Olympic cycling champion Chris Hoy. He attended Roseburn Primary School and Stewarts Melville College secondary school. He began canoeing at the age of 14, on the Water of Leith, and was eventually invited to join the Forth Canoe Club, where most of his training was done on the Union Canal. He went to the University of Nottingham and studied mathematical physics, but says his main reason for choosing to move to Nottingham was because it is the home of the National Watersports Centre. His father, George, is a former Scottish canoeing champion and his brother, Fraser also canoes for Scotland. His Uncle Angus Florence also canoed for Scotland.

Career
Florence finished 4th in the 2005 European Championships and 15th in the World Championships the same year. He also won a bronze medal in the World Cup event in Seu. In 2006 he improved to a sixth-place finish in the World Championships, won a bronze in the C1 team, and took the gold medal at the World Cup in Augsburg. In 2007 he took 5th place at the World Championships and two World Cup medals, bronzes in Prague and Augsburg. In 2009 he started competing in C2 alongside Richard Hounslow and he won a bronze in the C2 team event at the 2009 World Championships in La Seu d'Urgell. He went on to win a bronze in the C2 event at the 2010 World Championships in Tacen and another one in the C2 team event at the 2011 World Championships in Bratislava. At the 2013 World Championships in Prague he won 2 golds (C1 and C2) and 1 bronze (C2 team). He won a silver medal in the C1 team event at the 2017 world championships in Pau.

He won a total of eleven medals at the World Championships with three golds, one silver and seven bronzes. In 2009 he won the overall World Cup title in C1. Florence also has seven medals from the European Championships (1 gold, 1 silver and 5 bronzes). He finished three consecutive years as the C1 World No. 1, from 2011 to 2013.

2008 Olympics
At the 2008 Summer Olympics, in Beijing, Florence competed in the C1 event. He finished second overall, winning the silver medal behind Slovak world number one Michal Martikán. He completed his preliminary runs of the course at the Shunyi Olympic Rowing-Canoeing Park in 89.47 and 82.16 seconds, to lie 3rd overall, with a total time of 171.63 seconds, heading into the semifinal. His semifinal time of 90.46 seconds, qualifying him for the final in 4th place out of the ten advancing competitors. His final run of 88.15 seconds gave him a total time 178.61 seconds and meant he led with only Martikán left to compete, however the Slovakian went almost 2 seconds faster to push Florence into the silver medal position. After the event Florence said he had been inspired by the sight of Rebecca Adlington winning her 400 metres freestyle gold medal the day before.

2012 Olympics
Florence qualified for the C1 event at the 2012 Summer Olympics in London at the British trials. Thanks to the fact that his C2 partner Richard Hounslow qualified for the K1 event, they were able to start together in the C2 event as the second British boat in that category. Florence was a favourite to medal especially in the C1 event, but he failed to make the final after a semifinal run full of mistakes. He finished down in 10th place  which was a disappointment for him as well as the local fans. He and Hounslow (who also had a disappointing run in K1) made amends in the C2 event where they were able to win the silver medal behind their compatriots Tim Baillie and Etienne Stott and ahead of the three-time defending champions Pavol and Peter Hochschorner.

World Cup individual podiums

1 Pan American Championship counting for World Cup points
2 Oceania Championship counting for World Cup points

Astronaut application
Before the 2008 Olympics Florence had applied to become an astronaut in the European Space Agency's astronaut training programme in response to an advert he had seen, and was so serious about it that he began learning Russian, a mandatory requirement for the position. However he was not among the four people selected from the 8,400 applicants and received a rejection letter a short time before the start of the Olympics. After winning his Olympic medal he said of the application; "It wasn't a whim... It was an opportunity that came along to apply for something incredible. I tried but didn't get in."

See also
Canoeing at the 2008 Summer Olympics
Great Britain at the 2008 Summer Olympics

Notes and references

External links

 – Retrieved 11 September 2010.
12 September 2009 final results for the men's C2 team slalom event for the 2009 ICF Canoe Slalom World Championships. – Retrieved 12 September 2009.
British Olympic Association biography for David Florence

1982 births
Alumni of the University of Nottingham
Scottish male canoeists
Canoeists at the 2008 Summer Olympics
Canoeists at the 2012 Summer Olympics
Canoeists at the 2016 Summer Olympics
Living people
Olympic canoeists of Great Britain
Olympic silver medallists for Great Britain
Sportspeople from Aberdeen
Olympic medalists in canoeing
People educated at Stewart's Melville College
Medalists at the 2016 Summer Olympics
Medalists at the 2012 Summer Olympics
Medalists at the 2008 Summer Olympics
Scottish Olympic medallists
British male canoeists
Medalists at the ICF Canoe Slalom World Championships